Dark Remains 2005 American horror film written and directed by Brian Avenet-Bradley.  It stars Greg Thompson, Cheri Christian, and Scott Hodges.  A couple believes that their dead daughter may be attempting to contact them.

Plot 
After their daughter dies, Julie and Allen move to a rural location.  When Julie begins taking photographs of the area, she sees images of her dead daughter in them, and she begins to believe that her daughter may be attempting to communicate with them.

Cast 
 Greg Thompson as Allen Pyke
 Cheri Christian as Julie
 Scott Hodges as Jim Payne
 Jeff Evans as Sheriff Frank Hodges
 Rachel Jordan as Emma Pyke
 Michelle Kegley as Mrs. Payne
 Rachael Rollings as Rachel Roberts
 Karla Droege as Marianne Shore

Release 
Dark Remains was released on home video on December 26, 2006.

Reception 
Dennis Harvey of Variety called it "a genuinely creepy ghost story that packs maximum dread per reel".  Bloody Disgusting rated it 4/5 stars and wrote, "All in all, unbelievable. Dark Remains is a suspense film the like of which hasn’t been released in a long time."  Joshua Siebalt of Dread Central rated it 3.5/5 stars and wrote, "All in all, Dark Remains is a very solid ghost story with enough attention to detail and characterization to set it aside from its contemporaries."  Mitchell Wells of Horror Society wrote, "If you are a horror fan, I would really encourage you to watch it and see how the director is greatly influenced by old ghost films as well as new age ones."  Mike Long of DVD Talk rated it 2.5/5 stars and wrote that though the films "contains some creepy moments", the film was often boring, confusing, or both.
 
It was awarded best picture at the 2005 Rhode Island International Horror Film Festival.

References

External links 
 
 

2005 films
2005 horror films
American supernatural horror films
American independent films
American ghost films
Direct-to-video horror films
2000s English-language films
2000s American films